Feike Lietzen (7 October 1893 – 28 May 1970) was a Dutch footballer. He played in one match for the Netherlands national football team in 1922.

References

External links
 

1893 births
1970 deaths
Dutch footballers
Netherlands international footballers
Place of birth missing
Association footballers not categorized by position